Cell-Scape is the fifth album by Melt-Banana. It features electronic elements and marks a musical shift to a more accessible, hi-fi sound.

Cell-Scape also features some of the longest songs written by Melt-Banana, including "Shield for Your Eyes" at 4 minutes long. Yasuko sings with her "real" voice in the chorus of "If it is the Deep Sea, I Can See You There". The last track on the album is uncharacteristic of Melt Banana's typical musical style; it is a 10-minute-long electronic ambient song.

The song "Chain-Shot to Have Some Fun" was featured in an animated short movie called "Emily and the Baba Yaga".

There was no drummer on this album, and all the drums were programmed on a drum machine. Some of the patterns, however, were inspired by Dave Witte's drumming. There is also some debate about whether some of the drumming was performed by Dave Witte.

Track listing
All tracks by Melt-Banana

References

Melt-Banana albums
2003 albums